Hilalaye is a coastal well in the north-central Mudug region of Somalia.

Notes

References
Hilalaye
Satellite image of Hilalaye

Mudug